Moreno Martini may refer to:

Moreno Martini (1935–2005), Italian hurdler
Moreno Martini (born 1960), Italian decathlete